Prabha Shankar Mishra (6 August 1936 – 1 July 2012) or P.S. Mishra was an Indian Judge and the Chief Justice of Calcutta and Andhra Pradesh High Court.

Career
Mishra passed M.Sc. and LL.B. from Patna University and got the enrollment in 1960. He started practice in the Patna High Court and in 1982 he was appointed a Judge of the Patna High Court. Justice Mishra was transferred to the Madras High Court in 1990, thereafter appointed the Chief Justice of the Andhra Pradesh High Court in 1995. in 1997 he became the Chief Justice of the Calcutta High Court. A few weeks before retirement, Justice Mishra submitted his resignation on 5 July 1998 in protest of appointments to the Supreme Court. He criticised the way judges were appointed to highest court of India. After the resignation he started practice in the Supreme Court of India as a senior advocate. He died in 2012 at the age of 76.

References

1936 births
2012 deaths
People from Bihar
Indian judges
Chief Justices of the Andhra Pradesh High Court
Chief Justices of the Calcutta High Court
Judges of the Patna High Court
20th-century Indian lawyers
20th-century Indian judges